The 1984 All-Ireland Minor Football Championship was the 53rd staging of the All-Ireland Minor Football Championship, the Gaelic Athletic Association's premier inter-county Gaelic football tournament for boys under the age of 18.

Derry entered the championship as defending champions; however, they were defeated by Dublin in the All-Ireland semi-final.

On 23 September 1984, Dublin won the championship with a 1-9 to 0-4 victory of Tipperary in the All-Ireland final. This was their 10th All-Ireland title overall and their first in two championship seasons.

After this game, Jim Stynes, who was a part of the winning Dublin team, would go on to make his name in the Australian Football League playing for the Melbourne Football Club, whereby he would enter the Australian Football Hall of Fame as well as a slew of other impressive achievements within the code as a result of his involvement in the Melbourne Football Club's ambitious international recruitment program (now known as the "Irish experiment").

Results

Connacht Minor Football Championship
 
Quarter-Final

Semi-Finals

Finals

Leinster Minor Football Championship

Preliminary Round

Quarter-Finals

Semi-Finals

Final

Munster Minor Football Championship

Semi-Finals

Final

Ulster Minor Football Championship

Preliminary Round

Quarter-Finals

Semi-Finals

Final

All-Ireland Minor Football Championship

Semi-Finals

Final

Championship statistics

Miscellaneous

 Tipperary qualify for the All-Ireland final for the first time since 1955.

References

1984
All-Ireland Minor Football Championship